Happy Days is an American sitcom series that originally aired on ABC from 1974 to 1984.

Series overview

Episodes

Season 1 (1974)

Season 2 (1974–75)

Season 3 (1975–76)

Season 4 (1976–77)

Season 5 (1977–78)

Season 6 (1978–79)

Season 7 (1979–80)

Season 8 (1980–81)

Season 9 (1981–82)

Season 10 (1982–83)

Season 11 (1983–84)

Reunion specials

See also
 List of Laverne & Shirley episodes – includes part 2 of "Shotgun Wedding"
 List of Mork & Mindy episodes

Notelist

References

Lists of American sitcom episodes